Vitaliy Hryniv (born 5 April 1995) is a Ukrainian male track cyclist. He competed in the points race event and madison event at the 2015 UCI Track Cycling World Championships.

References

External links
 
 
 
 

1995 births
Living people
Ukrainian track cyclists
Ukrainian male cyclists
Place of birth missing (living people)
Cyclists at the 2019 European Games
European Games competitors for Ukraine
21st-century Ukrainian people